Joseph Burel Nicely (November 26, 1934 – September 24, 2010) was an American football offensive guard in the Canadian Football League for the Montreal Alouettes. He also was a member of the Washington Redskins in the National Football League. He played college football at West Virginia University.

Early years
Nicely attended Rupert High School. To play football, he had to walk 6 to 8 miles home after each practice.

He accepted a football scholarship from West Virginia University, where he became a starter at offensive guard offense and a middle guard on defense. As a senior, he missed three games with a broken bone in his hand. He participated in the Blue–Gray Football Classic, Senior Bowl and Chicago College All-Star Game.

Professional career
Nicely was selected by the Baltimore Colts in the third round (35th overall) of the 1958 NFL Draft. He was waived before the start of the season on September 9.

On September 12, 1958, he signed with the Montreal Alouettes of the Canadian Football League. He appeared in 5 games as a backup at offensive guard and offensive tackle. He was released on October 14.

On January 28, 1959, he signed with the Washington Redskins, where he was tried at center. On September 15, he was placed on the team's reserve list with an injury and was later signed to the taxi squad.

In 1960, Nicely was selected by the Dallas Cowboys in the expansion draft. He suffered from a blood infection that turned out to be Hepatitis C and did not make the team.

Personal life
Nicely had three fingers cut off from his right hand in an accident he had during his youth. He died on September 24, 2008.

References

External links

1934 births
2010 deaths
People from Greenbrier County, West Virginia
Players of American football from West Virginia
American football offensive guards
West Virginia Mountaineers football players
Montreal Alouettes players
Washington Redskins players